Spain competed at the 1992 Winter Olympics in Albertville, France.

Medalists

Competitors
The following is the list of number of competitors in the Games.

Alpine skiing

Men

Men's combined

Women

Cross-country skiing

Men

1 Starting delay based on 10 km results. 
C = Classical style, F = Freestyle

Men's 4 × 10 km relay

Freestyle skiing

Men

Luge

Men

References

 Official Olympic Reports
 International Olympic Committee results database
 Olympic Winter Games 1992, full results by sports-reference.com

Nations at the 1992 Winter Olympics
1992
Olympics